Devina is a rural locality (a village) in Oshibskoye Rural Settlement, Kudymkarsky District, Perm Krai, Russia. The population was 37 as of 2010.

Geography 
Devina is located 37 km southwest of Kudymkar (the district's administrative centre) by road.

References 

Rural localities in Kudymkarsky District